Côr Cymru is a Welsh TV competition searching for the best choir in Wales, which airs every 2 years on S4C. The first series was presented by Aled Jones and Heledd Cynwal in 2003, but subsequent series have been fronted by Nia Roberts and Gareth Owen. Facilities supplied by The Barcud Derwen Group.

Despite a similar show being developed by the BBC in the form of Last Choir Standing, S4C recently revealed Côr Cymru returned for a brand new series in 2009.

Format
The show sees choirs competing against each other in knockout-style semi finals in five different categories (female voice, male voice, mixed, youth (16–25 years), and children's choirs). The winners in each category then compete in the live final for the grand title of "Choir of Wales".

Winners
The winners of the title so far are:

Best conductor award
2007: Mari Pritchard: Côr Ieuenctid Môn (Anglesey Youth Choir)
2009: Sioned James: Côrdydd, Cardiff
2011: Islwyn Evans, Cywair
2013: Aled Phillips, Côr Meibion Rhosllannerchrugog (men)
2015: Janet Jones, Parti Llwchwr
2017: Eilir Owen Griffiths, CF1
2019: Mari Pritchard, Anglesey Youth Choir

Viewers' choice award
2011: Cantata, Llanelli (women)
2013: Côr y Cym (youth)
2015: Parti Llwchwr (women)
2017: Côr Ieuenctid Môn
2019: Côr Sioe Môn

Côr Cymru Cynradd (for primary school choirs)
2015: Ysgol Iolo Morganwg
2017: Ysgol Pen Barras
2019: Ysgol Teilo Sant

Eurovision Choir of the Year

S4C announced on 5 April 2017, that the winner of Côr Cymru 2017 will represent  at the Eurovision Choir of the Year 2017.

References

External links
  
  
 

2000s Welsh television series
2010s Welsh television series
2003 British television series debuts
S4C original programming
Welsh television shows
British reality television series
Singing talent shows
Biennial events